This list of tallest buildings in Thailand ranks skyscrapers in Thailand by height.
Within the Bangkok Metropolitan Administration area alone, there are over 160 completed buildings that stand are at least 150 metres (492 feet) in height.  Additionally, there are more than 40 skyscrapers under construction as of September 2022.

According to the Council on Tall Buildings and Urban Habitat database Bangkok is ranked 14th in the world in terms of the total number of skyscrapers.  According to Emporis, a leading database for building information, Bangkok is ranked 6th after Hong Kong, New York City, Shenzhen, Tokyo and Singapore in terms of cities with most buildings higher than 100 metres (328 feet), with 468 buildings counted for Bangkok.

The Greater Bangkok Metropolitan Region has the largest concentration of tall buildings in Thailand, followed by Pattaya and Chonburi on the east coasts.  There are, however, fewer opportunities to develop tall buildings in other populous urban centres such as Phuket and Chiang Mai due to strict building height regulations in those places.

Tallest completed buildings 
This list below ranks completed and topped out buildings in Thailand that stand at least 150 metres (492 feet) in height, based on standard height measurement, which includes spires and architectural details, but excludes antenna masts. The heights of these buildings have been sourced from the Council on Tall Buildings and Urban Habitat (CTBUH) database, as well as from environmental impact assessment (EIA) reports and SkyscraperPage, which is a website dedicated to providing information and discussion about high-rise buildings.

Tallest buildings under construction, approved and proposed

Under construction 
These are buildings over 150 metres (492 feet) in height under construction as of September 2022.

Approved and proposed 
List of proposed major buildings that will rise more than 150 metres, including those projects that received environmental approvals, cancelled or never built.

Timeline of tallest buildings
This lists buildings that once held the title of tallest structure in Thailand.

Cites with the most Skyscrapers 
This is a list of cities based on the number of finished skyscrapers that are at least 150 meters (490 ft) tall.

Tallest buildings by city
This is a list of the tallest buildings in each city, with heights greater than 100 metres (330 ft).

Tallest completed structures 
This is a list of the tallest structures in Thailand, based on their height from the base to the highest point. The list includes towers, transmission towers, bridges, chedis, temples, dams, and other structures but does not include buildings. Please note that this list is incomplete and possibly inaccurate, as the information about the height of transmission towers in Thailand is not widely publicized.

Tallest structures under construction or proposed 
This list provides information about the tallest structures currently under construction, on hold, cancelled, proposed, or approved. Note that buildings are not included. The list is not exhaustive and contributions are welcome to expand it, with appropriate citations to reliable sources.

Tallest statues 
This list compiles information about the tallest statues located in Thailand, highlighting the significant size and stature of these sculptures. Please note that this list is incomplete and possibly inaccurate.

Tallest statues under construction or proposed 
This list provides information about the tallest statues currently under construction, on hold, cancelled, proposed, or approved. The list is not exhaustive and contributions are welcome to expand it, with appropriate citations to reliable sources.

See also 
List of tallest buildings in Bangkok
List of tallest buildings in Asia
List of tallest buildings in the world

References

External links 
 Skyscraper.com Thailand diagram

Thailand
Tallest
Thailand